Lawrence Edward White was a Negro league pitcher in the 1940s.

White played for the Homestead Grays during their 1944 Negro World Series championship season. In his only professional season, he made four appearances on the mound, and recorded two hits in 12 plate appearances over six games.

References

External links
 and Seamheads

Place of birth missing
Place of death missing
Year of birth missing
Year of death missing
Homestead Grays players
Baseball pitchers